Igbo Americans, or Americans of Igbo ancestry, are residents of the United States who identify as having Igbo ancestry from modern day Nigeria. There are primarily two classes of people with Igbo ancestry in the United States, those whose ancestors were taken from Igboland as a result of the transatlantic slave trade before the 20th century and those who immigrated from the 20th century onwards partly as a result of the Nigerian Civil War in the late 1960s and economic instability in Nigeria. Igbo people prior to the American Civil War were brought to the United States by force from their hinterland homes on the Bight of Biafra and shipped by Europeans to North America between the 17th and 19th centuries.

Identified Igbo slaves were often described by the ethnonyms Ibo and Ebo(e), a colonial American rendering of Igbo. Some Igbo slaves were also referred to as 'bites', denoting their Bight of Biafra origin, and other names were used in reference to their home lands in Africa. Their presence in the United States was met with mixed feelings by American plantation owners because of their 'rebellious' attitudes to enslavement. Many of the enslaved Igbo people in the United States were concentrated in Virginia's lower Tidewater region and at some points in the 18th century they constituted over 30% of the enslaved black population. Igbo culture contributed to the creolised African American culture and is perhaps evident in such cultural vestiges as the Jonkonnu parades of North Carolina. Igbo Americans introduced the Igbo word okra into the English language
The recent migrant population from Nigeria settled in many of the United States' larger cities and urban centres and had come largely in search of economic opportunities in the late 20th century. Because of the realities of slavery and its erasure of African heritage and customs, most people who identify as Igbo in the United States and speak the Igbo language at home are from these families that arrived in the 20th century and forth.

History

Atlantic slave trade 

The Igbo were affected heavily by the Atlantic slave trade in the 18th century. Enslaved Igbo were known for being rebellious and having a high count of suicide in defiance of slavery. In the United States the Igbo were most numerous in the states of Maryland (coincidentally where there is a predominant population of recent Igbo immigrants) and Virginia, so much so that some historians have denominated colonial Virginia as “Igbo land.”

With a total of 37,000 Africans that arrived in Virginia from Calabar in the 18th century, 30,000 were Igbo according to Douglas B. Chambers. The Frontier Culture Museum of Virginia estimates around 38% of captives taken to Virginia were from the Bight of Biafra. Igbo peoples constituted the majority of enslaved Africans in Maryland. Chambers has been quoted saying "My research suggests that perhaps 60 percent of black Americans have at least one Igbo ancestor..."

Virginia

Virginia was the colony that took in the largest percentage of Igbo slaves. Researchers such as David Eltis estimate between 30 to 45% of the "imported" slaves were from the Bight of Biafra, of these slaves 80% were likely Igbo. A so-called conservative estimate of the amount of Igbo taken into Virginia between 1698 and 1778 is placed at 25,000. The Igbo concentration was especially high in the Tidewater and Piedmont regions of the Virginia interior. One of the reasons for this high number of Igbo slaves in Virginia was the domination of the Bight of Biafra region of Africa by Bristol and Liverpool English merchants who frequently brought Bight of Biafra slaves to British colonies, Virginia being one of these colonies. The high concentration of Igbo slaves in Virginia was contributed to further by neighboring states. Planters in South Carolina and Georgia looked down on Igbo slaves because many were rebellious. Because of this the majority of Igbo slaves were taken and sold to Virginian planters.

Some possible Igbo names were also found among slave records in Virginia. Names found in records such as Anica, or Anakey, Breechy and Juba may originate respectively from the Igbo names Nneka, meaning the mother is superior, and mburichi, male members of the Kingdom of Nri and Jiugba, meaning yam barn. Some had their ethnicity added to their names such as Eboe Sarah and plain Ebo. These hints of Igbo influence go along with cultural remnants pointing towards the Igbo presence in Virginia, one of which is the use of the Eboe drum in music. The Igbo presence in Virginia also brought new practices such as the cultivation of okra, a plant whose name derives from the Igbo language. Slaves in Virginia relied on sweet potato which is argued by Douglas Chambers to be an indication of a substitute for yam, the Igbo staple crop.

Kentucky
The state of Kentucky, which was carved out of the Colony of Virginia had received many of Virginia's slave drivers and slaves as people started migrating westward. These migrations spread out the population of African slaves in America, including Igbo slaves. Here the Igbo population had already become heavily creoleized alongside other African ethnicities that were taken in significant numbers to America.

Culture
African cultures were heavily suppressed in the United States. The plantation and slave owners made sure to suppress African cultures through intimidation and torture, stripping away slaves' names and heritage. As expected, Igbo culture faced the same oppression, however some cultural remnants of Igbo origin was found and can still be found in the United States. Most of these cultural remnants can be found in music and entertainment. Igbo culture manifested in America through the Jonkonnu festivals that once took residence in the black slave population in Virginia. This masquerade bears similarity with the masking traditions of the Okonko secret society who still operate in the Igbo hinterland. The maskers wear horns which further shows similarity to Igbo culture and the Ikenga deity. Heavily African influenced American music genres such as jazz and ragtime stem from a mix of African cultures that creolized in the Americas. Although these genres could be described as a mix, there are elements of American music that have specific origin and Igbo instruments, such as the 'Eboe Drum'. The Igbo opi flute is similar to the drum and fife traditions.

The novel Things Fall Apart by Chinua Achebe follows the story of Okonkwo, an Igbo leader and warrior. The novel alludes to many of the customs and historical happenings of post-colonial Igbo culture. The book has been critically acclaimed, often being referenced as the archetypal African novel written for the Western world.

Religion
The vast majority of Igbo Americans identify as Christian, with a significant amount of adherents to Roman Catholicism. Protestantism; including Anglicanism, Seventh day Adventist, Baptist, Methodist and non-denominational churches; make up the other denominations of Igbo Christians.

Igbo landmarks in America

Igbo village in Virginia
The Frontier Culture Museum of Virginia has completed an Igbo single-family farmers compound to acknowledge the prevalence of the Igbo in 19th century Virginia.

Igbo Landing 

Igbo Landing is a historic site in Dunbar Creek of St. Simons Island, Glynn County, Georgia, United States. In 1803 it was the location of a mass suicide by Igbo slaves in resistance to slavery in the United States, and is of symbolic importance in African American folklore and literary history.

Notable people 

 Nwando Achebe
 Chika
 Chinonye Chukwu
 Emmanuel Acho
 Nnamdi Obukwelu
 Kezie Okpala
 Ifeoma Onumonu
 Nneka Ogwumike
 Sam Acho
 Sonny Digital
 Ego Nwodim
 Kristine Anigwe
 Josh Uche
 Akuoma Omeoga
 Ngozi Onwumere
 Uzo Aduba
 Nonso Amadi
 Onyeka Okongwu
 Chuma Okeke
 Chituru Odunze
 Michaela Onyenwere
 Romeo Okwara
 Julian Okwara
 Kennedy Nzechukwu
 Tracy Ifeachor
 Ike Ibeabuchi
 Albert Okwuegbunam
 Chiney Ogwumike
 Kimberly Anyadike
 Nnamdi Asomugha
 Chukwu octuplets
 Michael Onwenu
 Ezinne Kalu
 Jeff Okudah
 Ike Diogu
 Megalyn Echikunwoke
 Philip Emeagwali
 IK Enemkpali
 Justin Madubuike
 Erica Ogwumike
 Okwui Enwezor
 Emmanuel Chukwudi Eze
 Fat Tony (rapper)
 Godfrey (comedian)
 Germain Ifedi
 Chioma Igwe
 Uzodinma Iweala
 Bobby Iwuchukwu
 Brian Iwuh
 Jesse Iwuji
 Jidenna
 Julie Iromuanya
 Obi Melifonwu
 Cristian Morton
 Nnamdi Moweta
 Chinedum Ndukwe
 Ikechuku Ndukwe
 Anthony Njokuani
 Ogonna Nnamani
 David Nwaba
 Uzoma Nwachukwu
 Ike Nwamu
 Uche Nwaneri
 Tobe Nwigwe
 Amarachi Nwosu
 Mendi & Keith Obadike
 Leslye Obiora
 Cyril Obiozor
 Chris Ogbonnaya
 Cedric Ogbuehi
 Chiney Ogwumike
 Nneka Ogwumike
 KC Ohaebosim
 Alex Okafor
 Emeka Okafor
 Jahlil Okafor
 Joe Okafor
 Chike Okeafor
 Nnedi Okorafor
 Amobi Okoye
 Nkeiru Okoye
 Bennet Omalu
 Holmes Onwukaife
 Tochi Onyebuchi
 Oguchi Onyewu
 Brian Orakpo
 Yvonne Orji
 Kelechi Osemele
 Cheta Ozougwu
 Sonny Digital
 Chioma Ubogagu
 Valerian Ume-Ezeoke
 Michael Uzowuru
 Tyler, the Creator
 John Amaechi

See also
 History of Nigerian Americans in Dallas–Fort Worth
 African diaspora
 African Americans
 Afro-Puerto Rican
 Nigerian Americans
 Igbo people
 Igbo Jamaican
 Things Fall Apart
 Yoruba Americans

References

Further reading
 Chambers, Douglas B. (2005). "Murder At Montpelier: Igbo Africans In Virginia". 
 Sea Island slavery (Igbo landing) - The moonlit road

External links
 Igboguide.org - Insight into Igbo Culture and Language

 
West Africans in the United States